Statistics of DPR Korea Football League for the 2011 season.

Overview
The championship was played over six rounds, after which the top four teams – April 25, Kigwanch'a, Sobaeksu, and Amrokkang – played a final tournament in P'yŏngyang in November 2011, which was won by April 25.

Final standings

Clubs
4.25 (Namp'o)
Amrokkang (P'yŏngyang)
Ponghwasan
Kyŏnggong'ŏp
Kigwanch'a (Sinŭiju)
Maebong
Man'gyŏngbong (P'yŏngyang)
P'yōngyang City Sports Club (P'yŏngyang)
Rimyŏngsu (Sariwŏn)
Ryongnamsan
Sobaeksu (P'yŏngyang)

References

DPR Korea Football League seasons
1
Korea
Korea